Associated Industries China, Inc., known as AG Neovo, is a Taiwan-based multinational computer hardware and electronics company, headquartered in Nangang District, Taipei, Taiwan. Its main products include computer monitors, digital signage, commercial display, large format display, surveillance display, and healthcare displays.  The company was established on May 18, 1978. In 1999, it transitioned its business direction to the development of electronic technology. In October of the same year, the company launched its owned brand - AG Neovo, with branch offices for Europe, Asia, and North America. Its digital photo frames and desktop computer monitors were once awarded by IF Product Design Award and Taiwan Excellence Awards.

Brand Name 
AG Neovo. AG is an abbreviation of Aktiengesellschaft, which is a German term for a public limited company. Neovo is said to be a portmanteau of two Greek words, Neo and Vo.

History 

Associated Industries China, Inc. was founded in 1978 in Taipei, Taiwan, producing steel intermodal containers as the revenue source.
In 1992, it was first listed on the Taiwan Stock Exchange under the ticker code 9912. In October 1999, it launched its own brand name AG Neovo.

In 2000, the company's business direction changed to the hi-tech industry.  At the beginning, the business covered both computer monitors OEM and AG Neovo owned-branded product sales and marketing.
In 2003, it withdrew from the OEM business, focusing on brand owned business. The product line includes computer monitors, digital photo frames, large format displays, surveillance displays and digital signage display products.

In 2014, it set up the healthcare business unit. This product line includes dental handpieces and portable dental units.
In 2017, it set up the Solutions business unit. This product lines includes cloud-based digital signage, interactive flat panel displays and display management software.

Products 

 Monitor and Hardware Displays: Desktop monitors, security monitors, clinic monitors, transportation monitors.
 Digital Signage Displays: Large format commercial displays, video wall displays.
 Interactive Displays: Industrial multi-touch displays, interactive flat panel displays.
 Hardware and Software: Digital signage cloud-based content management system, PID command and control software, interactive meeting software.
 Accessories: Monitor mounts, stand mounts, on-desk mounts, display open frame, video signal extension.
 Dentist Equipment: High speed and low speed handsets, portable dental units.

See also 
 List of glossy display branding manufacturers
 List of computer system manufacturers
 List of companies of Taiwan

References 

Electronics companies of Taiwan
Taiwanese brands
Electronics companies established in 1978
Companies listed on the Taiwan Stock Exchange
Display technology companies
1978 establishments in Taiwan